Sebastián Gorga Nogueira (born 6 April 1994) is a Uruguayan footballer who plays as a defender for Rampla Juniors in the Liga de Ascenso.

References

External links

1994 births
Living people
Club Nacional de Football players
Genoa C.F.C. players
Club de Gimnasia y Esgrima La Plata footballers
Chacarita Juniors footballers
Club Deportivo Palestino footballers
Montevideo Wanderers F.C. players
Club Atlético River Plate (Montevideo) players
Uruguayan Primera División players
Argentine Primera División players
Uruguayan expatriate footballers
Uruguayan expatriate sportspeople in Italy
Uruguayan expatriate sportspeople in Argentina
Uruguayan expatriate sportspeople in Chile
Uruguayan footballers
Uruguay youth international footballers
Association football defenders
Pan American Games medalists in football
Pan American Games gold medalists for Uruguay
Footballers at the 2015 Pan American Games
Medalists at the 2015 Pan American Games